Hector Naismith Crighton (April 2, 1900 – April 17, 1967) was a Canadian football coach. He coached 35 seasons of high school Canadian football, and he also rewrote the rule book in 1952. He was inducted into the Canadian Football Hall of Fame in 1986. The Hec Crighton Trophy, given each year to the outstanding CIS football player, is named after him.

References

Canadian Football Hall of Fame inductees
Canadian football people from Toronto
1900 births
1967 deaths
Coaches of Canadian football